Little Creek Hundred may refer to:

Little Creek Hundred, Kent County, an unincorporated subdivision of Kent County, Delaware.
Little Creek Hundred, Sussex County, an unincorporated subdivision of Sussex County, Delaware. 

See List of Delaware Hundreds.